Vino de la tierra is a quality of Spanish wine that designates the rung below the mainstream quality wine classification of denominación de origen protegida (DOP). It is the equivalent of the French vin de pays. It represents a higher quality than table wine, and covers still wine, sparkling wine, and fortified wine. Since 2016 the classification is called indicación geográfica protegida (IGP), but wines can still use the traditional name of vino de la tierra. The labels of vino de la tierra wines are allowed to state the year of vintage and the grape varieties used in production.

In 2019 there were 42 registered vino de la tierra wines in Spain.

Current IGP / VdlT designations

Andalusia
 Altiplano de Sierra Nevada
 Bailén
 Cádiz
 Córdoba
 Cumbres del Guadalfeo
 Desierto de Almería
 Laderas del Genil
 Laujar-Alpujarra
 Los Palacios
 Norte de Almería
 Ribera del Andarax
 Sierra Norte de Sevilla
 Sierra Sur de Jaén
 Sierras de las Estancias y los Filabres
 Torreperogil
 Villaviciosa de Córdoba
Aragon
 Bajo Aragón
 Ribera del Gállego-Cinco Villas
 Ribera del Jiloca
 Ribera del Queiles (multi-regional)
 Valdejalón
 Valle del Cinca
Balearic Islands 
 Formentera
 Ibiza
 Illes Balears
 Isla de Menorca
 Mallorca
 Serra de Tramuntana-Costa Nord
Cantabria
 Costa de Cantabria
 Liébana
Castile and León
 Castile and León
Castilla–La Mancha
 Castilla
Extremadura
 Extremadura
Galicia
 Barbanza e Iria
 Betanzos
 Ribeiras do Morrazo
 Val do Miño-Ourense
La Rioja
 Valles de Sadacia
Murcia 
 Murcia
 Campo de Cartagena
Navarre 
 Ribera del Queiles (multi-regional)
 3 Riberas
Valencia
Castelló

Similar wine classifications in Europe
Levels corresponding to vino de la tierra in other countries are:
 Indicazione geografica tipica for equivalent quality wines from Italy.
 Landwein for equivalent quality wines from Germany, Austria and South Tyrol.
 Landwijn for equivalent quality wines from Netherlands.
 Regional wine for equivalent quality wines from the United Kingdom.
 Vin de pays for equivalent quality wines from France, Luxembourg and Val d'Aosta.
 Vinho regional for equivalent quality wines from Portugal.
 Viño da terra for equivalent quality wines from Galician-speaking regions in Spain.
 Vi de la terra for equivalent quality wines from Catalan-speaking regions in Spain.
 Ονομασία κατά παράδοση (traditional name) or τοπικός οίνος (regional wine) for equivalent quality wines from Greece.

References

Spanish wine
 Wine regions of Spain
Wine classification